Awful Nice is a 2013 American comedy film directed by Todd Sklar and written by Sklar and Alex Rennie. The film stars Rennie, James Pumphrey, Christopher Meloni, Brett Gelman, Keeley Hazell and Josh Fadem. The film was released on March 7, 2014, by Screen Media Films.

Cast
Christopher Meloni as Jon Charbineau
Alex Rennie as Dave Brouillette
James Pumphrey as Jim Brouillette
Brett Gelman as Ivan
Laura Ramsey as Lauren
Keeley Hazell as Petra
Henry Zebrowski as Jasper
Zahn McClarnon as Romulus
Saginaw Grant as Jonas
Charlie Sanders as Sheriff Wegman
Josh Fadem as Deputy Bruce
Jon Gabrus as Klaus
D.C. Pierson as Sven
Dominic Dierkes as Yven
Kerry Barker as Svetlana
Hari Leigh as Michelle
Nick Renkoski as Nick Becker
John Turk as Rick Ohlson
Yakov Smirnoff as Himself

Release
The film premiered at South by Southwest on March 8, 2013. The film was released on March 7, 2014, by Screen Media Films.

References

External links
 
 

2013 films
2013 comedy films
American comedy films
2010s English-language films
2010s American films
Films shot in Columbia, Missouri